Jadwinów may refer to the following places:
Jadwinów, Łódź Voivodeship (central Poland)
Jadwinów, Radom County in Masovian Voivodeship (east-central Poland)
Jadwinów, Zwoleń County in Masovian Voivodeship (east-central Poland)